Daniel Hartwich (born 18 August 1978) is a German TV presenter.

Biography
Hartwich's mother is a nurse. After completing his Abitur in 1998, he studied German and political science at Goethe University in Frankfurt. During his studies, he began to work as a reporter and presenter for radio and television. He first worked for Hessischer Rundfunk. After his entry as a reporter at their studio in Kassel, he hosted the morning show at hrXXL. After changes within the show, Hartwich hosted the shows hr3 Madhouse and 0138/ 6000. He also hosted shows at You FM. For his presentation of YOU FM Roadshow, he earned his first radio gig.

He hosted the ZDF/KI.KA broadcast of TKKG – Der Club der Detektive. After a short guest performance at DMAX, he became committed to the RTL Group. After various stints as a reporter (Fit for Fun TV and Wissenshunger) at VOX, he got his own late night show on RTL, Achtung! Hartwich, for which he was nominated for the Deutscher Fernsehpreis and the Deutscher Comedypreis.

In 2008, Hartwich hosted the program Das Supertalent together with Marco Schreyl. In January 2009, RTL sent him to the Australian jungle, where he was the special in the fourth season of Ich bin ein Star – Holt mich hier raus!, hosted by him. In addition, he regularly acts as a reporter for RTL, among other things for the shows Unglaublich! – Die Show der Merkwürdigkeiten and Einspruch – Die Show der Rechtsirrtümer. In 2009, he again hosted Das Supertalent and was awarded the Goldene Kamera in January 2010.

In 2010, Hartwich, together with Nazan Eckes, hosted the third season of Let's Dance. He succeeded Hape Kerkeling. In 2011, he hosted with Sylvie Meis for the first time. This was followed by Hartwichs Hockenheim-Test and the 101 Ways to Leave a Gameshow at RTL before he hosted, for the third time and together with Schreyl, Das Supertalent.

In 2011, he hosted his own comedy game show on RTL, H wie Hartwich, in which Hartwich got into unusual situations and the outcome was predicted by the audience. In the spring of 2012, he hosted with Meis again Let's Dance, for which they were awarded the Bavarian TV Prize. In the summer of 2012, he hosted Total Blackout – Stars im Dunkeln. He presented the jury, along with Thomas Gottschalk and Michelle Hunziker, for Das Supertalent 2012.

In January 2013, Hartwich succeeded Dirk Bach in hosting Ich bin ein Star – Holt mich hier raus!, together with Sonja Zietlow. He also moderated the game show Cash Crash and the German versions of Celebrity Family Feud and All Star Family Fortunes.

Filmography

TV presenter

Ongoing
 2008–present: Das Supertalent, RTL
 2010–present: Let's Dance, RTL, with Nazan Eckes (series 3), Sylvie Meis (series 4–10) and Victoria Swarovski (series 11–)
 2017–present: Meet the Parents, RTL
 2017–present: Nachsitzen! – Promis zurück auf die Schulbank, RTL
 2017–present: Keep it in the Family, RTL
 2020: I Can See Your Voice, RTL

Former/One-time
 2005–2006: TKKG – Der Club der Detektive, ZDF/KiKA
 2006–2007: D Tech, DMAX
 2008: Einmal im Leben – 30 Dinge, die ein Mann tun muss, RTL
 2008: Achtung! Hartwich, RTL
 2010: 101 Wege aus der härtesten Show der Welt, RTL
 2009–2011: Einspruch – Die Show der Rechtsirrtümer, RTL
 2011: H wie Hartwich, RTL
 2012–2014: Der RTL Comedy Grand Prix, RTL
 2012: Total Blackout – Stars im Dunkeln, RTL
 2013: Cash Crash, RTL
 2013–2014: Celebrity Family Feud and All Star Family Fortunes, RTL
 2013–2022: Ich bin ein Star – Holt mich hier raus! (with Sonja Zietlow) , RTL
 2014: Deutschland sucht den Superstar, RTL, as a stand in for Nazan Eckes on 26 April 2014
 2015: Hartwichs 100! Daniel testet die Deutschen, RTL
 2015: Ich bin ein Star – Lasst mich wieder rein! (with Sonja Zietlow), RTL
 2015: Stepping Out, RTL
 2016: Crash Test Promis, RTL
 2017: It Takes 2 (with ), RTL

Filmography
 2016: Sing (voice of Buster Moon)

Awards
 2012: Bayerischer Fernsehpreis for hosting Let's Dance (with Sylvie Meis)
 2013: Deutscher Comedypreis for hosting Ich bin ein Star – Holt mich hier raus! (with Sonja Zietlow)
 2014: Krawattenmann des Jahres
 2015: Romy award in the Show category
 2015: "Man of the Day" by Express on 19 June

References

External links

 
 „RTL hat Wort gehalten“: Hartwich über seine Pläne – Interview by DWDL.de
 Interview mit dem Online-Magazin back view

1978 births
Living people
Television people from Frankfurt
German game show hosts
RTL Group people
Hessischer Rundfunk people
ZDF people